Sylleste H. Davis (born October 12, 1961) is an American politician. She is a member of the South Carolina House of Representatives from the 100th District, serving since 2016. She is a member of the Republican party.

Davis is Chair of the House Medical, Military, Public and Municipal Affairs Committee.

Electoral history

References

Living people
1961 births
Republican Party members of the South Carolina House of Representatives
21st-century American politicians
College of Charleston alumni
Webster University alumni

Women state legislators in South Carolina